The 1990 Paris-Roubaix was the 88th edition of the Paris–Roubaix single-day cycling race.

References

1990 in French sport
1990
1990 in road cycling
April 1990 sports events in Europe
1990 UCI Road World Cup